Spiral bacteria, bacteria of spiral (helical) shape, form the third major morphological category of prokaryotes along with the rod-shaped bacilli and round cocci. Spiral bacteria can be subclassified by the number of twists per cell, cell thickness, cell flexibility, and motility. The two types of spiral cells are spirillum and spirochete, with spirillum being rigid with external flagella, and spirochetes being  with internal flagella.

Spirillum

A spirillum (plural spirilla) is a rigid spiral bacterium that is Gram-negative and frequently has external amphitrichous or lophotrichous flagella.  Examples include:
 Members of the genus Spirillum
 Campylobacter species, such as Campylobacter jejuni, a foodborne pathogen that causes campylobacteriosis
 Helicobacter species, such as Helicobacter pylori, a cause of peptic ulcers

Spirochetes

A spirochete (plural spirochetes) is a very thin, elongate, flexible, spiral bacteria that is motile via internal periplasmic flagella inside the outer membrane. They comprise the phylum Spirochaetes. Owing to their morphological properties, spirochetes are difficult to Gram-stain but may be visualized using  dark field microscopy or Warthin–Starry stain. Examples include:
 Leptospira species, which cause leptospirosis.
 Borrelia species, such as Borrelia burgdorferi, a tick-borne bacterium that causes Lyme disease
 Treponema species, such as Treponema pallidum, subspecies of which causes treponematoses, including syphilis

References

Bacteria